Franklin Cale (born 10 May 1983) is a South African football midfielder who plays for National Professional Soccer League club Ubuntu Cape Town.

Personal
He hails from Ocean View, Cape Town.

Career
Long poised for an overseas move Cale joined Mamelodi Sundowns in December 2009 for a reported fee of R5.5m. This effectively made him one of the most expensive players in the history of South African soccer.

International career
He made his international debut in a friendly against Norway on 10 October 2009. He has so far been capped five times.

External links 

1983 births
South African soccer players
Association football midfielders
Living people
Cape Town Spurs F.C. players
Sportspeople from Cape Town
Cape Coloureds
Mamelodi Sundowns F.C. players
South Africa international soccer players
SuperSport United F.C. players